Nixon Peabody LLP is a Global 100 law firm, with more than 700 attorneys collaborating across major practice areas in cities across the U.S. as well as international offices in Shanghai, Hong Kong, London,. The firm's U.S. office locations include: Boston, New York City, Washington, D.C., Chicago, San Francisco, Los Angeles, Palo Alto, Albany, Buffalo, Manchester, Rochester, and Providence. The firm ranks #67 on Vault's top 100 law firms and #75 on the American Lawyer 100.

Clients include emerging and middle-market businesses, national and multinational corporations, financial institutions, public entities, educational and not-for-profit institutions, and individuals. The firm represents clients such as JetBlue, Constellation Brands, Corning Incorporated, and Gannett Co., among others. Additionally, the firm has represented parties in the financing of new stadiums for the Mets and Yankees. The firm has nearly thirty teams that focus on specific industries or areas of law.

Nixon ranked 66th on Fortune Magazine's Best Companies to Work for in 2008, the third time the firm has appeared on the list. Boston Business Journal has similarly ranked its Boston office as one of the best places to work in Massachusetts. Wired has described the firm as having "a progressive mentality.

Stephen Zubiago serves as the Nixon Peabody's chief executive officer and managing partner, a role he has held since February 2021. Andrew Glincher is the firm's senior chairman.

History 
Nixon Peabody was formed by the 1999 merger of two firms that began practicing more than a century ago: Nixon, Hargrave, Devans & Doyle LLP and Peabody & Brown. Nixon Hargrave was originally a Rochester, New York, firm that had grown to become one of the largest law firms in New York. It had a strong corporate/institutional practice and a nationally recognized public finance practice. Boston-based Peabody & Brown had a nationally recognized syndication practice and was active in middle and high-growth markets.

In 2000, Nixon Peabody merged with Sixbey Friedman Leedom & Ferguson in Northern Virginia, doubling the size of its intellectual property practice.

The firm expanded into California in 2001 through a merger with Lillick & Charles, founded in San Francisco in 1897.  Throughout the 20th century, Lillick developed a strong base of international clients in Asia and Europe, and played a prominent role as advisor to many California businesses. Over the years, Lillick's practice grew to include some of the leading transportation, financial, insurance, and industrial companies in the world.

In December 2002, Nixon Peabody merged with the 150-year-old Boston firm of Hutchins, Wheeler & Dittmar, adding fifty attorneys in the areas of business, litigation, and health services.

As of 2008, the firm had 1,728 employees in the U.S. and two abroad. The average salary for an 
Associate Attorney was $178,016, and for a secretary $67,733. Women make up 59% of employees, minorities 19%. The firm offers domestic partner benefits for same-sex couples.

In late 2008, when many law firms were collapsing or announcing layoffs, Nixon Peabody declared an objective to double the size of the firm in the next three or four years, a move its global head of finance termed "a necessity for our firm." The firm said it would hire up to 100 attorneys from the dissolving firm Thelen LLP, and in October took on 25 lawyers in Paris, a move that led to a legal dispute with UK firm Taylor Wessing.

In April 2014, Nixon Peabody announced it cut 38 positions, reportedly for "operational efficiency through a flatter administrative structure and a more centralized legal support model."

In February 2015, Chicago-based mid-sized law firm Ungaretti & Harris LLP merged into Nixon Peabody, adding 100 attorneys and experience in corporate, health care, real estate, litigation, public finance, intellectual property and government relations.

In October 2015, Nixon Peabody consolidated operations with CWL Partners, a firm based in Hong Kong. The two firms had been formally associated with each other since 2010. The combined firm is known as Nixon Peabody CWL in Hong Kong, but will remain as Nixon Peabody LLP in the U.S., Europe and in the firm's Shanghai, China, office. The combination adds 30 lawyers and staff, and increases the firm's Asia presence.

Size and earnings
According to the National Law Journal's 2014 NLJ 350 ranking of firms based on size, Nixon Peabody, with 584 attorneys, was the 69th largest firm in the United States.  With $411,500,000 in gross revenue in 2013, the firm was #70 on The American Lawyer's 2014 Am Law 200 ranking.  On the 2013 Global 100 survey, Nixon Peabody ranked as the 88th highest grossing law firm in the world.  It ranked 48 on the Pro Bono scorecard and 105 on the Diversity scorecard.

Awards and rankings
Nationally, the firm is ranked by U.S. News & World Report in the first tier in such categories as Commercial Litigation, Corporate Law, Employment Law – Management, Franchise Law, Health Care Law, Labor Law – Management, Litigation - First Amendment, Litigation - Labor & Employment, Mass Tort Litigation / Class Actions – Defendants, Public Finance Law, Real Estate Law, Tax Law, and Trusts & Estates Law.  In 2008, Fortune Magazine named Nixon Peabody one of the 100 best companies to work for.

Best Lawyers and U.S. News & World Report named Nixon Peabody as the 2015-2016 "Law Firm of the Year" for Health Care Law, and the 2011-2012 "Law Firm of the Year" for Franchise Law. Dow Jones Private Equity Analyst ranked the firm 3rd nationally for the number of private equity and venture capital funds that had a final close in 2011 (387) and 17th for the number of private equity and venture capital deals negotiated and closed that year (205). In 2011, The Bond Buyer recognized the Commonwealth of Massachusetts billion-dollar accelerated bridge program as both Northeast Regional Deal of the Year and the 2011 Deal of the Year.

In 2015 Nixon Peabody received its tenth consecutive 100% ranking by the Human Rights Campaign's (HRC) Corporate Equality Index on lesbian, gay, bisexual, and transgender (LGBT) equality in corporate America. Nixon Peabody was named to the HRC's 2012 "Best Places to Work for (LGBT) Equality" list.

Pro bono
In 2011, Nixon Peabody attorneys spent an average of 56 hours on pro bono matters, or 3.7% of their billable hours. The firm as a whole contributed 37,539 hours to pro bono work. The firm "targets 3% of billable hours annually for pro bono work."

Nixon Peabody has worked on behalf of a wide range of pro bono clients, including microfinance work veterans' affairs, asylum and immigration cases, domestic violence matters and with various legal aid organizations on a wide range of matters, in some cases as part of a corporate partnership (the firm's Albany office partners with General Electric's Global Research division on community pro bono matters).

In 2009, the Manchester office launched the Nixon Peabody Domestic Protection Team, aimed at assisting victims of domestic violence. In 2012, Nixon Peabody partners co-authored the amicus brief by the New York State Bar Association in Fisher v. University of Texas, et al. The NYSBA brief argues that the government has a compelling interest in promoting diversity in the legal profession, something that cannot happen without meaningful diversity in the undergraduate pipeline.

Nixon Peabody members have mentored students in Providence, Rhode Island, under a YMCA program called Championing Our Students.

The firm was ranked 46 out of 200 in the 2012 American Lawyer Pro Bono Survey.

Up to 60 hours of pro bono work by Nixon Peabody lawyers can be counted toward the 1,900 bonus target. There is  a firmwide pro bono partner and there are individuals in each office who belong to the pro bono committee. They "send out details of opportunities almost every day." Associates unanimously declare that they have taken numerous cases, ranging from domestic violence cases and restraining orders through to drug conspiracy trials, as well as representing child victims of trafficking and obtaining benefits for veterans.

Practice areas
 Corporate & Finance
 Government Relations & Regulatory
 Health Services
 Industries
 Intellectual Property
 International Services
 Labor & Employment
 Litigation
 Private Clients, Estate, Trust & Financial Planning
 Real Estate & Community Development

Litigation
Chambers describes Nixon Peabody's litigation activities as involving commercial litigation, IP litigation, product liability, government investigations, white-collar defense, arts & cultural institutions and Indian law & gaming. Lawyers at the Washington office perform much of their work at the Court of Federal Claims. Despite a "generally positive opinion of firm culture," junior lawyers have complained about the lack of transparency between upper management and associates.

Offices
Nixon Peabody has an array of 13 US branches plus 3 international offshoots in London, Hong Kong and Shanghai. Offering a full spread of practices, a few of which are garlanded with regional Chambers USA rankings."

IT team
The firm's IT team was ranked 9th in 2011 by Computerworld. The magazine noted that it had "centralized the firm's data centers, consolidated its storage assets and virtualized its servers, going from 300 physical servers to 30 VMware ESX servers, all located in its primary data center. The effort cut power consumption by approximately 30%." Also, the technology department "spent $30,000 to retrofit printers as part of its best practices for office paper management, converting nearly all printers to double-sided printing by default. Moreover, the firm encourages its employees to keep documents in an electronic form instead of printing them out. As a result, paper usage has dropped by 15%, saving an average of 120 cartons -- or 600,000 sheets -- of paper every month."

Assistance to Guantanamo captives
Attorneys from Nixon Peabody prepared the habeas corpus petition for captives held in extrajudicial detention in the United States Guantanamo Bay detention camps, in Cuba.

Charles "Cully" Stimson, then Deputy Assistant Secretary of Defense for Detainee Affairs, stirred controversy when he went on record criticizing the patriotism of law firms that allowed employees to assist Guantanamo captives: "corporate CEOs seeing this should ask firms to choose between lucrative retainers and representing terrorists."

Cannabis therapy
In June 2014, Cannabis Therapy Corp., which aimed "to become a leader in the research, development and commercialization of safe, all-natural, THC-free cannabinoid-based medicinal therapies and supplements," hired Nixon Peabody "to manage and protect its current and future intellectual property assets."

Buffalo Bills
In March 2012, Nixon Peabody was selected as Erie County's outside counsel in negotiations with the Buffalo Bills to renew its lease for Ralph Wilson Stadium.

Scott Brown
Former Massachusetts senator Scott Brown announced in March 2013 that he was joining Nixon Peabody's Boston office. At the same time he became a Fox News contributor and joined a corporate board. "During my time in politics, I never hesitated to reach across the aisle to work with members of any political party to secure a preferable outcome," Brown said. "My approach is consistent with the way Nixon Peabody does business and I believe we can be successful together." Politico noted that "Nixon Peabody has a stable of former elected officials," including Tom Reynolds, a former New York congressman and Republican Congressional Committee chairman.

Brown said he would be working out of Boston and focusing "on matters relating to the financial services industry and commercial real estate....Though he will be leaning heavily on his Washington contacts to drum up business for the firm, he will not be a lobbyist," said officials of the firm.

It was reported in April 2014 that Brown, who had been looking into a Senate run in New Hampshire, was no longer with the firm. "We enjoyed having Scott as a member of our team," Andrew Glincher, the firm's chief executive and managing partner, said. "We wish him all the best in his future endeavors."

David Tamman
A former Nixon Peabody partner, David Tamman, who in 2012 was sentenced to seven years in prison for conspiring to obstruct justice, altering documents, and abetting a client's false testimony, all in connection with an effort to cover up a client's Ponzi scheme, sued the firm for not paying for his legal defense. In September 2014,  a California state appeals court declined to reject his claim. Nixon Peabody had argued that his suit violated the firm's First Amendment rights, but the court held that "the inclusion of allegations involving protected activity does not subject a claim to the anti-SLAPP statute where the protected activity merely preceded or triggered the lawsuit."  Tamman's appeal, arguing that sentencing guidelines were incorrectly applied, was denied by the Ninth Circuit Court of Appeals on April 6, 2015.

In September 2009, Melissa Mahler was sued by the SEC for having engaged in insider trading when she was a Nixon Peabody associate in 2004. Mahler, who had left the firm in 2005 when her insider trading came to light, was charged with having bought 10,000 shares of a client's stock after learning of plans for a merger. The firm said that she had left "immediately after we learned that her personal conduct had come under regulatory scrutiny."

Tamman was granted a full pardon on January 20, 2021.

Anthem
The firm commemorated its first ranking in the Fortune Magazine list with a celebratory anthem titled, "Everyone's a Winner at Nixon Peabody." The anthem was leaked to the legal gossip blog AboveTheLaw.com.  The firm threatened blogger David Lat with legal action if the anthem was not promptly removed from his blog, which only fanned the flames of the story and spread it to the mainstream media.

See also
 Mudge Rose Guthrie Alexander & Ferdon

References

External links 
Official Firm Website

Law firms established in 1999
Law firms based in New York City
Law firms based in Boston
1999 establishments in New York (state)
Foreign law firms with offices in Hong Kong